William Colston Albrant (24 June 1871- 3 August 1905) was an American architect practicing in Fargo, North Dakota.

Biography
Albrant was born in Winchester, Ontario in 1871. In 1895 he moved west, planning to make his way as a farmer. However, later that year he enrolled in the Division of Mechanical Arts of the North Dakota Agricultural College at Fargo.

By December 1897 he had established his own architectural office in Fargo. He practiced until his unexpected death at the age of 34 in 1905.

After his death his office was managed by William D. Gillespie, Albrant's younger brother-in-law, and became W. C. Albrant & Company. Gillespie advertised for an associate to manage the firm, and it was reorganized as R. J. Haxby & Company in March 1906.

Despite his short career Albrant designed several major North Dakota buildings, including the state's first purpose-built public library, in Mayville. Several of his buildings are listed on the U.S. National Register of Historic Places.

Works
 Kindred State Bank Building, 411 Elm St., Kindred, North Dakota (1900)
 Mayville Public Library, 52 Center Ave. N., Mayville, North Dakota (1900) 
 Union Block and Lura Building, 21-29 W. Main St., Mayville, North Dakota (1900) 
 Union Block, 3-9 N. Main St., Hillsboro, North Dakota (1900)
 Minard Hall, North Dakota Agricultural College, Fargo, North Dakota (1901)
 Jacobson Block (Opera House), 2 Main St. N., Minot, North Dakota (1902) - Burned 1923.
 Robb-Lawrence Building, 650 Northern Pacific Ave., Fargo, North Dakota (1903) - Possibly inspired by nearby work of Cass Gilbert.
 Valley City Public Library, 413 Central Ave., Valley City, North Dakota (1903)
 Carnegie Library (Putnam Hall), North Dakota Agricultural College, Fargo, North Dakota (1904–05)
 First Baptist Church, 720 1st Ave. S., Fargo, North Dakota (1904) - Demolished. 
 Milroy Public School, Milroy, Minnesota (1904–05) - Demolished.
 Moose Jaw City Hall, Fairford St. W., Moose Jaw, Saskatchewan (1904–05) - Demolished.
 Phillips Academy, New Rockford, North Dakota (1904–05) - Demolished.
 Sykeston Public School, B St., Sykeston, North Dakota (1904) - Demolished.
 Old Main (Expansion), Mayville State Normal School, Mayville, North Dakota (1905)
 Y. M. C. A. Building, 630 1st Ave. N., Fargo, North Dakota (1905) - Demolished.

References

Architects from North Dakota
People from Fargo, North Dakota
1871 births
1905 deaths
Canadian emigrants to the United States
20th-century American architects
North Dakota State University alumni
People from the United Counties of Stormont, Dundas and Glengarry